Chad Lawson is an American pianist and composer. After performing as a member of the Summit Records act Chad Lawson Trio from 1997 to 2004, Lawson performed as a member of Julio Iglesias' tour band, which inspired him to release his debut studio album Set on a Hill (2009). Lawson's fifth studio album The Chopin Variations (2014), a collaboration with violinist Judy Kang and cellist Rubin Kodheli, reached number one on the Billboard Top Classical Albums chart. He debuted as a major label musician through Decca Records in 2020, with the extended play Stay. Lawson is known as the composer of the podcasts Lore and Unobscured, both works created by Aaron Mahnke.

Career

Lawson did not come from a musical family, and was inspired to play piano at five years old by watching the band Sha Na Na perform in their eponymous 1970s television series. He was classically trained in piano, and spent his high school years dreaming of attending the Peabody Institute, however the conservatory turned down his application after hearing that Lawson aimed to become a studio musician. Lawson started composing songs when he was given his first keyboard, a Korg M1, and played piano in a cover band during high school.

Lawson attended the Berklee College of Music where he majored in jazz performance, which was his first experience learning improvisation. While attending college, Lawson successfully worked as a studio musician, to the point where he did not see much of a reason to keep attending the school. After leaving Berklee, Lawson toured with guitarist Babik Reinhardt, later attending the Appalachian State University for a semester to learn computer science, before moving to Charlotte, North Carolina. In 1997, Lawson formed the Chad Lawson Trio alongside drummer Al Sergel, and bassist Zack Page, and recorded their debut album as a Christmas present for his mother. Lawson did not intend to release the album at first, however after submitting the work for a radio station competition and winning, decided to self-release the album. The trio released two further albums: Dear Dorothy: The Oz Sessions (2002), a jazz reinterpretation of the music of The Wizard of Oz (1939) released through Summit Records, and Unforeseen (2004), an album that mixed original compositions with jazz standards, as well as covers of Soundgarden and The Police. Lawson then moved to New York to continue his studies, studying with pianist Hal Galper, and privately with the head of the Manhattan School of Music, Garry Dial. In 2007, Lawson performed internationally as a member of Julio Iglesias' tour band. Experiencing Iglesias' tour inspired Lawson to record music as a soloist.

In 2009 after returning to the United States, Lawson released his debut solo album Set on a Hill, a primarily improvised jazz piano album produced by William Ackerman. The album was awarded the album of the year by Whisperings: Solo Piano Radio. After the release of the album, Lawson moved back to Charlotte after experiencing health problems. His sophomore album, The Piano (2011), was awarded the SoloPiano.com classical album of the year. Lawson's 2013 album The Space Between was mostly written in a single day, and songs from the album were widely broadcast through RTVE and Echoes.

In 2014, Lawson released the album The Chopin Variations, a double album reinterpreting the works of Chopin (one side solo piano, one side collaborations with violinist Judy Kang and cellist Rubin Kodheli), which was widely successful, reaching number one on the Billboard Top Classical Albums chart. In 2015, Lawson collaborated with veteran electro producer Man Parrish on the album Beautiful. Lawson followed The Chopin Variations with a second classical re-imagining in 2016, this time of Bach's chorale works.

From 2016, Lawson began acting as the composer for the podcast Lore, as well as the podcast's Prime Video adaptation. Lawson collaborated with Lore creator Aaron Mahnke again for the soundtracks of his podcast Unobscured, and the theme song for the podcast Cabinet of Curiosities.

Lawson's 2018 album Re:Piano saw him experiment with loops and effects using an iPad, and reached number five on the Billboard Classical Albums chart.

In 2020, Lawson released his debut major label extended play, Stay, through Decca Records. The album was written in honor of Mental Health Awareness Month in the US.

Calm It Down 

Chad Lawson created, writes, voices, and produces the independent podcast, Calm It Down. The podcast airs on a weekly basis, and is released every Tuesday.

Launched in September 2020, Calm It Down guides listeners through techniques for breathing and meditation while tackling mental health subjects such as anxiety and suicide. Each 15 minute episode aims to give listeners a break from the stresses of modern life, while also offering tools for positive, constructive, and encouraging ways to process thoughts. Lawson first had the idea for the Calm It Down podcast from the many messages he received from fans of his musical career, who would recount to him how his music helped them through many dark and difficult times in their lives. By combining his music, experiences, and meditation techniques, Lawson is able to bring his passion for mental health and emotional wellbeing to an even bigger audience. Calm It Down was nominated in 2021 for an iHeartRadio Podcast Award in the category of best Spirituality and Religious podcast.

Artistry 

Lawson cites Reese Wynans, Keith Jarrett and Benmont Tench as his biggest musical influences.

Personal life

Lawson met his wife Barbara in Charlotte, North Carolina, when he waited tables at the Capital Grille steakhouse. The pair married in 2006 after Lawson moved to New York City. Together they have two sons.

Discography

Studio albums

Extended plays

Soundtracks

Singles

References

External links

1975 births
Living people
20th-century American composers
20th-century American male musicians
20th-century American pianists
21st-century American composers
21st-century American male musicians
21st-century American pianists
American male pianists
American television composers
Composers for piano
Male television composers
New-age pianists
Appalachian State University alumni
Berklee College of Music alumni
Classical musicians from North Carolina
Jazz musicians from North Carolina
People from Morganton, North Carolina